La Única RT is a Spanish rugby team based in Pamplona.

External links
La Única RT

Spanish rugby union teams
Rugby union in the Basque Country (greater region)
Rugby clubs established in 1984
Sport in Pamplona
Sports teams in Navarre